Nathan Lee Ramsey (July 12, 1941 – March 8, 2019) was a former professional American football safety and cornerback who played for the Philadelphia Eagles for most of his 11-year NFL career from 1963 through 1973.  Ramsey was drafted by the Eagles from Indiana University in the fourteenth round (186th overall) of the 1963 NFL Draft.

Ramsey played high school football at Neptune High School, in Neptune Township, New Jersey.

Ramsey died on March 8, 2019.

References

1941 births
2019 deaths
Neptune High School alumni
People from Neptune Township, New Jersey
Sportspeople from Monmouth County, New Jersey
American football safeties
American football cornerbacks
Indiana Hoosiers football players
Philadelphia Eagles players
New Orleans Saints players
Players of American football from New Jersey